The 2020–21 season is Buriram United's 9th season in the Thai League. (11th if including P.E.A.'s two seasons) The club will enters the season as the Thai League runners-up, and will participate in the top-level league. They will also participate in the domestic cups, FA Cup, and continental cup, AFC Champions League, which they will start at preliminary round 2 for the first time since 2013 season.

This is Buriram's first season without Suchao Nuchnum, the club's former captain who played as midfielder, due to his announcement on November 26, 2019.

In the league, match 5–30 are postponed following the coronavirus outbreak.

Club information

Squad information

Transfers

In

Out

Loan return

Friendlies

Pre-Season Friendly

Mid-Season Friendly

Competitions

Overview

Thai League

League table

Results overview

Matches

Notes
The matches since week 5 are postponed following the coronavirus outbreak and will be played with limited spectators following the new normal regulations.

FA Cup

AFC Champions League

Preliminary round 2

Play-off round

Statistics

Appearances
Players with no appearances are not included in the list.

Goalscorers
Includes all competitive matches. The list is sorted by shirt number when total goals are equal. 
 Player who left the club during the season.

Clean sheets

Notes

References

External links
 Club website
 Thai League

Buriram
Buriram United F.C. seasons